Karl Wagner was a German luger who competed in the late 1920s. He won a bronze medal in the men's singles event at the 1928 European luge championships in Schreiberhau, Germany (now Szklarska Poręba, Poland).

References
List of European luge champions 

German male lugers
Year of birth missing
Year of death missing